Benjamin N. O. Addison was a Ghanaian politician and mayor of Accra Metropolitan Assembly during the Kwame Nkrumah regime from 1963 to 1966.

References 

Mayors of Accra